The canton of Saint-Flour-1 is an administrative division of the Cantal department, southern France. It was created at the French canton reorganisation which came into effect in March 2015. Its seat is in Saint-Flour.

It consists of the following communes:
 
Andelat
Auriac-l'Église
Bonnac
La Chapelle-Laurent
Coltines
Coren
Ferrières-Saint-Mary
Lastic
Laurie
Leyvaux
Massiac
Mentières
Molèdes
Molompize
Montchamp
Rézentières
Roffiac
Saint-Flour (partly)
Saint-Mary-le-Plain
Saint-Poncy
Talizat
Tiviers
Valjouze
Vieillespesse

References

Cantons of Cantal